Jan Stokláska (born February 7, 1983) is a Czech former track and field sprinter and bobsledder. As a sprinter he won two national titles in 2005, over 100 metres and 60 metres. He began competing in bobsleigh from 2007 onwards. At the 2010 Winter Olympics in Vancouver, he finished 12th in the four-man event and 13th in the two-man event.

Stokláska's best finish at the FIBT World Championships was sixth in the two-man event at Altenberg, Germany in 2008.

National titles
Czech Athletics Championships
100 m: 2005
Czech Indoor Athletics Championships
60 m: 2005

References
 
 Jan Stoklaska at NBC Olympics

1983 births
Living people
Czech male bobsledders
Czech male sprinters
Olympic bobsledders of the Czech Republic
Bobsledders at the 2010 Winter Olympics
Bobsledders at the 2018 Winter Olympics
Czech Athletics Championships winners